CUHSD may refer to:
 Campbell Union High School District
 Central Union High School District
 Chowchilla Union High School District